Verkola is a rural locality (a selo) and the administrative center of Verkolskoye Rural Settlement of Pinezhsky District, Arkhangelsk Oblast, Russia. The population was 370 as of 2010. There are 7 streets.

Geography 
Verkola is located on the Pinega River, 49 km southeast of Karpogory (the district's administrative centre) by road. Novy Put is the nearest rural locality.

References 

Rural localities in Pinezhsky District
Pinezhsky Uyezd